Devadanapatti  is a panchayat town in Periyakulam Taluk, a part of the Theni district in the Madurai Region in the state of Tamil Nadu, India. It is located at the bottom of the Kodaikanal Hills.

Etymology
The name Devadanapatti is a combination of two Tamil words: 'devadhanam' which means 'gods donated to' or 'gods gifted to' and 'Patti,' which means "village.' Therefore, the meaning of Devadanapatti is a village gifted by the gods.

Geography
The north and east sides of the town have panoramic views of the irrigated landscape, including paddy fields, sugar plantations, plantain fields, and coconut tree groves. Water for agriculture is supplied through the canal and the check dams across the river from Manjalar Dam which is built down under the Kodaikanal hills. Water from the rivers Varattaru, Thalaiyar, and Iruttaaru fill the dam.

Demographics

Population 
According to the 2011 Census of India, Devadanapatti had a population of 19,285 people. Males made up 50.8% (9,797) of the population and females made up 49.15% (9,488). The total literate population was 12,563, a literacy rate of 65%, with 7,033 literate males and 5,530 literate females. 10.8% of the population was under six years of age. 85.99% of the town was Hindu, and 13.44% were Muslim.

Government and politics

Civic Utility / Amenities / Services  

There is a primary healthcare hospital run by the Tamil Nadu government. Devadanapatti also has a police station and a post office. There is a weekly market that sells groceries and cattle. 24-hour bus access is provided by the Theni and Dindigul main road.

Economy 

Agriculture is the primary income source for residents.

Culture/Cityscape

Landmarks 

An ancient Kamakshi temple called the Moongilanai Kamakshi temple was built here. The main door of the temple is never opened and poojas are performed only at the door. Maha Shivaratri (Tamil month of Masi) in March is the only festival that is celebrated inside the temple. The story of the temple is described in the Tamil movie "Mahashakti Mariamman".

Education 
 
This town panchayat has four schools: a higher secondary school run by Tamil Nadu Government, a middle school run by the Hindu management, a primary school run by the Church of South India, and another Kallar primary school run by the Tamil Nadu government.

References

Cities and towns in Theni district